Gérard Tremblay, P.S.S. (October 27, 1918 – September 28, 2019) was a Canadian bishop of the Roman Catholic Church.

Tremblay was born in Montreal, Quebec, Canada, and ordained a priest on June 16, 1946, for the Society of Saint-Sulpice. He was appointed auxiliary bishop of the Archdiocese of Montreal and titular bishop of Trisipa on March 20, 1981, and consecrated on May 22, 1981. Tremblay retired as auxiliary bishop of Montreal on August 27, 1991. He turned 100 in October 2018.

References

External links
 Catholic-Hierarchy
 Diocese site

1918 births
2019 deaths
20th-century Roman Catholic bishops in Canada
Canadian centenarians
Clergy from Montreal
Men centenarians